The House of Da Vinci is a 2017 puzzle adventure game developed by Slovak indie studio Blue Brain Games. The game is based on fictional events that occurred during the Renaissance.
The game is available in English, French, German, Spanish, Brazilian Portuguese, Czech, Slovak, Russian, Turkish, Italian, Polish, Japanese, Korean, Simplified Chinese, Hindi and Malay.

In 2019, Blue Brain Games released a sequel The House of Da Vinci 2.

Premise 
The story is set up in Florence, Italy during the Renaissance. The player is Leonardo Da Vinci's most promising apprentice. Leonardo has disappeared. The player starts searching for the truth in Leonardo Da Vinci's house. However, Leonardo's workshop is full of puzzles, inventions, escape mechanisms and objects hidden in all corners of decorated rooms. The players have to solve series of puzzles in different rooms in order to find whether Da Vinci has left any message for them.

Gameplay
Apart from complex puzzles that are physics based, the player gains access to two lenses with supernatural abilities. With one, they can see hidden codes and with the other they can see what had happened in the past. The player occasionally gets to see letters from their master Da Vinci and also from the antagonists. The player gets closer to finding the truth after completion of every level.

Development 
Blue Brain Games is an indie team of graphic artists and developers, all of whom are people interested in both 3D puzzle games and the renaissance genius Leonardo da Vinci. The House of Da Vinci was successfully funded on Kickstarter in late 2016. 2,391 adventure game enthusiasts backed the game.

Reception 
Merlina McGovern of adventuregamers.com rated the game 3.5 out of 5 wrote that "Although The House of Da Vinci is slightly marred by persnickety mechanics and the occasionally frustrating puzzle, exploring the mind of a genius by reverse engineering his inventions will pull you into a gorgeous Renaissance world and keep you challenged throughout."  

AppUnwrapper', in their review wrote, "If you're a fan of The Room series by Fireproof Games and can't wait for the fourth one to release, Blue Brain Games' The House of Da Vinci is the closest thing you can get to the real thing." 

Reviewing the iOS version, Emily Sowden of PocketGamer said "The House of Da Vinci has two major areas to focus on. One: the unavoidable fact that it's essentially The Room in a different package. Two: the unavoidable fact that it's actually a decent game."

Maria Alexander of Droidgamer rated the game 9/10. The game was rated 9 for aesthetics, 9.2 for gameplay, 8.7 for innovation and 9.1 for value. "The House of Da Vinci is a massive, gorgeous, cleverly designed puzzler that gives The Room, its main inspiration, a pretty good run for its money.", she said.

Sequels 
On December 4, 2019, Blue Brain Games released a sequel, The House of Da Vinci 2, for iOS. A Google Play Store version was released on February 18, 2020, with a Steam version on May 29, 2020.

On August 25, 2021, Blue Brain Games announced The House of Da Vinci 3, the upcoming conclusion to the trilogy.

References

External links 

2017 video games
Android (operating system) games
Florence in fiction
IOS games
MacOS games
Puzzle video games
Video games developed in Slovakia
Video games set in Italy
Windows games